The Malaysian Anti-Corruption Commission, abbreviated MACC or SPRM, (formerly known as Anti-Corruption Agency, ACA or Badan Pencegah Rasuah, BPR) is a government agency in Malaysia that investigates and prosecutes corruption in the public and private sectors. The MACC was modelled after top anti-corruption agencies, such as the Independent Commission Against Corruption of Hong Kong and the Independent Commission Against Corruption in New South Wales (ICAC), Australia.

There are five independent bodies that monitor the MACC to ensure its integrity and to protect citizen's rights. These bodies are managed separately from other government offices in order to provide an independent perspective. The five bodies are: the Anti-Corruption Advisory Board, the Special Committee on Corruption, the Complaints Committee, the Operations Review Panel, and the Corruption Consultation and Prevention Panel.

The MACC once headed by Chief Commissioner Azam Baki, replacing Latheefa Koya on 9 March 2020.

Logo

Star (14 Corners) 
The star reflects the excellence of 13 corrupt-free states and governments, and that its citizens are strong in religious and psychological values and are driven by the highest level of ethics.

Crescent 
The crescent moon reflects the Islamic religion which is also the official religion of the country. Knowledge of religion and taqwa can avoid self-inflicted acts of corruption.

Interlocking Kris 
Symbolizes the authority accorded to MACC officers, as prescribed in the laws of the nation, in executing their duties to combat corruption and their readiness to shoulder the people's aspiration to go forth even in the face of a thousand obstacles and challenges.

Shield 
Symbolizes self defense tools and implies that the task of intelligence being implemented efficiently and with the quality of the informant is kept confidential.

Rice Flower 
Emphasize progress, prosperity and success in a society that is completely moral and ethical. All complaints received will be conducted accordingly without prejudice with trust, firmness and fairness.

Tiger 
The tiger symbolizes courage and strength in performing all tasks despite a thousand obstacles and challenges still ahead.

14 White and Red Stripes 
Reflects on educational activities about corruption and its adverse effects, encompassing all states in Malaysia.

Jawi script 
The Jawi script symbolizes the spirit of preserving the nation's heritage and state treasures in order to be inherited by the upcoming generations.

The Colors 
The colors can be explained as follows:
 Gold: Symbolizes the most valuable struggle that is to combat corruption in order to achieve invaluable success: a corruption-free State.
 Yellow: Symbolizes that justice is one of the key points in the MACC's charter in whatever decision is taken regardless of rank and race.
 Blue: Reflects trust and harmony. This means that in addition to enforcing the law, the MACC also designed and implemented a corruption prevention program through information, education, and community relations programs.
 Black: Symbolizes the accuracy and stability of a solid spirit and a powerful struggle.
 Dark Gray: The gray color is a neutral color that lies between white and black, symbolizing the freedom and transparency of the MACC in the fight against corruption without the intervention of any party.
 Red: Symbolizes the spirit of struggle to defend the sovereignty and dignity of the country despite being forced to shed blood.
 White: Symbolizes a clean soul in a holy struggle to uphold the truth and to eliminate evil.

List of MACC Chief Commissioners 
 Ahmad Said Hamdan (14 May 2007 – 31 December 2009)
 Abu Kassim Mohamed (1 January 2010 – 31 July 2016)
 Dzulkifli Ahmad (1 August 2016 – 14 May 2018)
 Mohamad Shukri Abdull (17 May 2018 – 4 June 2019)
 Latheefa Beebi Koya (4 June 2019 – 6 March 2020)
 Azam Baki (9 March 2020 – Present)

Notable investigations and controversies

High-profile investigations 
On 31 July 2010, the MACC Chief, Abu Kassim Mohamed, pledged to resign if any graft reports were not investigated by his agency, including high-profile cases involving government ministers. In a challenge Raja Petra Kamarudin, a popular online blogger and political activist began publishing what he claims are MACC copies of investigation reports against the former Anti-Corruption Agency (ACA) chief Zulkifly Mat Noor, National Civics Bureau (BTN) director-general Shagul Hamid Abdullah and former Menteri Besar of Selangor Khir Toyo. Also included is a preliminary investigation report based on a report where Kulim assemblyman Lim Soo Nee claimed that he was offered a bribe to defect to Barisan Nasional (BN) coalition.

Deaths in custody 
On 16 July 2009, Teoh Beng Hock was found dead on the 5th floor of Plaza Masalam after falling from the 14th floor after giving his statement to MACC officers in the Selangor MACC office in Shah Alam. Beng Hock was the political aide to state assemblyman and executive councillor Ean Yong Hian Wah. Beng Hock was being questioned on an alleged corruption investigation involving Ean Yong. An inquest was held and the coroner returned an open verdict. Following this, a Royal Commission of Inquiry was set up to ascertain the cause of death. The Royal Commission released their findings on 21 July 2011 deciding that Teoh Beng Hock had committed suicide. Teoh's family however refused to accept the findings and insists that he was actually murdered.

On 6 April 2011, Ahmad Sarbani Mohamed was found dead on the badminton court after falling from the 3rd floor of the Federal Territory MACC office in Kuala Lumpur. Ahmad Sarbani was a customs officer based in Port Klang. He was alleged to be involved in a corruption investigation involving 62 customs officers.

Murder of High Ranking MACC Officer 
Datuk Anthony Kevin Morais ( – September 2015)  was a Deputy Public Prosecutor for the Attorney General's Chambers of Malaysia and MACC. Morais was last seen alive on 4 September 2015 leaving his Menara Duta condominium in Segambut, Kuala Lumpur for work at the Attorney-General's Chambers in Putrajaya. His youngest brother filed a missing person's report late the next day. Earlier, a car matching the model he owned was found in a palm oil plantation in Perak. His body was found in a concrete-filled drum at USJ 1, Subang Jaya, Selangor on 16 September 2015.

Sabah State Water Department corruption probe

On 4 October 2016, the commission confiscated more than RM114.5 million during an operation into the Sabah State Water Department office, with the ex-Deputy Chief Commissioner, Azam Baki, describing it as the first largest confiscation involving corruption in the commission's history.

Arrest of former Prime Minister Najib Razak 

On 3 July 2018, Former Prime Minister Najib Razak was arrested by MACC, investigating how RM42 million (US$10.6 million) went into Najib's bank account from SRC International Sdn Bhd, the investment company of 1Malaysia Development Berhad (1MDB). Police seized 1,400 necklaces, 567 handbags, 423 watches, 2,200 rings, 1,600 brooches and 14 tiaras worth $273 million.

On 28 July 2020, the High Court convicted Najib on all seven counts of abuse of power, money laundering and criminal breach of trust, becoming the first Prime Minister of Malaysia to be convicted of corruption, and was sentenced to 12 years' imprisonment and fined RM210 million.

See also 

 Corruption in Malaysia

References

External links 
 MACC official website
 Thestar.com.my

Anti-corruption agencies
Federal ministries, departments and agencies of Malaysia
Government agencies established in 1967
2009 establishments in Malaysia
Prime Minister's Department (Malaysia)